Cerekwica  is a village (former town) in the administrative district of Gmina Trzebnica, within Trzebnica County, Lower Silesian Voivodeship, in south-western Poland. Prior to 1945 it was in Germany.

References

Cerekwica
Former populated places in Lower Silesian Voivodeship